Ubuntu Local Municipality is a local municipality in the Pixley ka Seme District Municipality of the Northern Cape province of South Africa.

Its seat is Victoria West; other towns in the municipality are Richmond, Loxton and two small railway villages Hutchinson and Merriman.

Main places
The 2011 census divided the municipality into the following main places:

Criticism
The Ubuntu Municipality has been criticised for illegal traffic fines and harassing motorists.

Politics

The municipal council consists of eleven members elected by mixed-member proportional representation. Six councillors are elected by first-past-the-post voting in six wards, while the remaining five are chosen from party lists so that the total number of party representatives is proportional to the number of votes received.  In the election of 1 November 2021 the African National Congress (ANC) won a majority of seven seats.

The following table shows the results of the 2021 election.

References

External links
 http://www.ubuntu.gov.za/

Local municipalities of the Pixley ka Seme District Municipality